A Stolen Waltz (Swedish: En stulen vals) is a 1932 Swedish drama film directed by Lorens Marmstedt and starring Ernst Eklund, Ragnar Falck and  Aino Taube.

Synopsis
Inga, a struggling music student living in a Stockholm boarding house, overhears a piece of music and submits it as her own composition the following day. Allan, a music publisher, is impressed and buys the rights to the tune. However Inga is filled with guilt that she has stolen the music from its unknown author.

Cast
 Ernst Eklund as Allan Dehner
 Ragnar Falck as 	Ludvig Fryckt
 Aino Taube as Inga
 Anna-Lisa Baude as 	Miss Gullkvist
 Maritta Marke as Black Sheep
 Erik 'Bullen' Berglund as 	Hovmästare
 Lili Ziedner as Ursula
 Gunnel Lindgren as Eva
 Eric Abrahamsson as Alarik Berenius
 Jenny Tschernichin-Larsson as 	Kristina
 Doris Nelson as Agata
 Sickan Carlsson as 	Aina
 Erik Forslund as 	Juror
 Hanny Schedin as Garderobiär
 Ulla Sorbon as 	Pensionatsgäst
 Carl-Gunnar Wingård as 	Head Waiter
 Wiktor Andersson as 	Hobo

References

Bibliography 
 Qvist, Per Olov & von Bagh, Peter. Guide to the Cinema of Sweden and Finland. Greenwood Publishing Group, 2000.

External links 
 

1932 films
Swedish drama films
1932 drama films
1930s Swedish-language films
Films directed by Lorens Marmstedt
Swedish black-and-white films
1930s Swedish films